FSSC may refer to:

 Coëtivy Airport, Seychelles
 Federated Supreme Student Council, a student association at Laguna State Polytechnic University, Santa Cruz, Philippines
 Foundation Skills for Social Change Certificate Programme, International Federation of Workers' Education Associations#Foundation Skills for Social Change Certificate Programme
 F.S.Sc., letters appended after the name of a member of the Society of Science, Letters and Art
 FSSC 22000, an international food safety system certification scheme

See also
 FSSC-R or Fear Survey Schedule for Children, a test for death anxiety in children